Timothy A. Tetrick, born November 22, 1981, in Flora, Illinois, is an American Harness Racing driver. Tim started driving Standardbreds at a very young age and on November 27, 2007, broke the record of number of wins (1,077) in a single year.  Tim drove his 1,078th winner at Dover Downs in Delaware on the way to recording 1,189 wins that year. Class of the 2020 USHWA Hall of Fame!

Tetrick won the 2012 Hambletonian Stakes with his horse Market Share. He won his 8,000th career race in March 2014. He was voted Harness Tracks of America Driver of the Year for 2007, 2008, 2012, and 2013 by the US Harness Writers Association.

He underwent hip replacement surgery in early December, 2008 for a congenital hip problem, but was back competing by late January 2009.

Tetrick's colors are green and gold. He is also recognizable on the track by the bright yellow wheels on the sulky he drives. He has been a resident of Runnemede, New Jersey.

References

External links
Tim Tetrick Making his Mark
Tetrick Wins Number 1,078 
Tetrick wins Number 12,000

People from Flora, Illinois
People from Runnemede, New Jersey
1981 births
Living people
American harness racers
Dan Patch Award winners